The 2018–19 PSA Men's World Squash Championship was the 2018–19 men's edition of the World Squash Championships, which serves as the individual world championship for squash players. The event will take place in Chicago, United States from 23 February - 2 March 2019.   

Ali Farag won his first world title beating Tarek Momen in the final continuing the recent Egyptian domination of the sport.
Former world champion Ramy Ashour was forced to withdraw from the tournament following further injury problems.

Seeds

Draw and results

Finals

Main draw

Top half

Bottom half

+ Tuominen replaced Ashour

See also
 World Squash Championships
 2018–19 PSA Women's World Squash Championship

References

World Squash Championships
M
M
Squash tournaments in the United States
International sports competitions hosted by the United States
Squ
Squ
Squ
Squ
PSA Men's World Squash Championship
PSA Men's World Squash Championship